RMHS may refer to the following high schools:

Railway Mixed High School (English Medium) in Golden Rock
Railway Mixed High School (English Medium) in Jolarpet
Reading Memorial High School in Massachusetts
Red Mountain High School in Mesa, Arizona
Reitz Memorial High School in Evansville, Indiana
Richard Montgomery High School in Maryland 
Rocky Mountain High School (disambiguation), multiple schools 
Rolling Meadows High School in Illinois 
R.M.H.S Vadavucode in Kochi, Kerala